The 1923 U.S. Figure Skating Championships was held on February 15 and 16 in New Haven, Connecticut.

Senior results

Men
After 1918 champion and reigning silver medalist Nathaniel Niles withdrew due to an injury, Sherwin Badger won his fourth straight national title.

Ladies
Theresa Weld Blanchard won her fourth straight national championship and fifth overall, narrowly defeating Beatrix Loughran.

Pairs
Theresa Weld Blanchard and Nathaniel Niles were the only competitors and won their fifth national crown.

Junior results

Men

Ladies

Pairs

Sources
 "The National Championships", Skating magazine, December 1923

U.S. Figure Skating Championships
United States Figure Skating Championships, 1923
United States Figure Skating Championships, 1923
February 1923 sports events